Trifurcula alypella is a moth of the family Nepticulidae. It is found in mainland Spain, Mallorca and France.

The habitat consists of warm limestone areas.

The wingspan is 4.75–5 mm.

The larvae feed on Globularia alypum. They mine the leaves of their host plant. The mine starts as an inconspicuous whitish corridor with yellow brown frass. Then the corridor follows the leaf margin in a somewhat wavy pattern. In this stage, there is a black frass line that varies in width but never takes the full width of the corridor. In the end, the corridor switches from upper-surface to lower-surface or vice versa. The exit slit is usually upper-surface. Recognisable mines are generally found in larger leaves. Small leaves are completely and unrecognisably mined out.

External links
Über neue mediterrane und kanarische Nepticuliden (Lep., Nepticulidae). - Mitteilungen der Münchner Entomologischen Gesellschaft
bladmineerders.nl

Nepticulidae
Moths of Europe
Moths described in 1975